Dudley Coutts Marjoribanks, 1st Baron Tweedmouth, also known as the Laird of Guisachan and Glenaffric, (29 December 1820 – 4 March 1894), was a Scottish businessman and a Liberal politician who sat in the House of Commons from 1853 until 1880, when he was elevated to the peerage as Baron Tweedmouth. He was the breeder of the first golden retriever.

Life
Marjoribanks was the son of Edward Marjoribanks of Greenlands who was a senior partner in Coutts Bank. He was unable to acquire the partnership in the Bank (it passed to his elder brother Edward) but he inherited a substantial fortune from his father, a partner in Coutts & Co Bank from 1796 until his death on 17 September 1868, aged 92. As to his parentage there was some controversy. Although the Lyon Office of Scotland registered his family pedigree, he was accused of being a charlatan. The disproofs were offered as a statement of contradiction concerning his descent. Burnett of the Lyon's Herald wrote an article in The Genealogist upholding the Lyon Office's original assertion of genuine authenticity.

Dudley Coutts, as his banking second name implies, acquired considerable family wealth of his own after the purchase of Meux Brewery. He grew rich as a partner of Meux & Co's brewery, and later a director of the East India Company. With some of this wealth he built the mansion of Brook House in London's fashionable Park Lane.

In 1854 he began leasing the highland deer forest of Guisachan in Glen Affric, Inverness-shire, buying Guisachan outright in 1856. He also leased substantial estates of Hutton and Eddington near his family roots in Berwickshire. Marjoribanks had large kennels at Guisachan and was directly responsible for developing a new breed of dog, the Golden Retriever.

In 1868, Majoribanks bred Nous, a Wavy-coated Retriever, with Belle, a Tweed Water Spaniel. This created the foundation litter of Golden Retriever.puppies, three yellow wavy-coated puppies named Crocus, Cowslip and Primrose. These (three) offspring of Nous and Belle became the foundation of the breed subsequently known as, and now universally loved as, the Golden Retriever.

Family

He married Isabella Hogg, daughter of Sir James Hogg, Bt, in 1848. Their children were:

 Edward Marjoribanks, 2nd Baron Tweedmouth (married Lady Fanny Octavia Louise Spencer-Churchill in 1873)
 Mary Georgina Marjoribanks (married Matthew White Ridley, 1st Viscount Ridley in 1873)
 Stewart (died aged 11)
 Annie Grizel (died aged 1)
 Ishbel (married John Campbell Hamilton-Gordon, 1st Marquess of Aberdeen and Temair in 1877)
 Coutts Marjoribanks (married Agnes Margaret Kinloch in 1895)
 Archibald John Marjoribanks (married Elizabeth Trimble Brown of Tennessee in 1897; operated the Rocking Chair Ranche, and died in 1900)

Marjoribanks was descended from James Marjoribanks, a younger son of Thomas Marjoribanks of Ratho, head of the lowland Clan Marjoribanks, both of whom lived in the 16th century in Edinburgh.

References

Bibliography

External links 
 

1820 births
1894 deaths
Barons in the Peerage of the United Kingdom
British bankers
Coutts, Dudley
Coutts, Dudley
Coutts, Dudley
Coutts, Dudley
Coutts, Dudley
Coutts, Dudley
Coutts, Dudley
UK MPs who were granted peerages
Directors of the British East India Company
Peers of the United Kingdom created by Queen Victoria
19th-century British businesspeople